Paul Laurence Dunbar High School is part of Dayton City Schools. The school is located in Dayton, Ohio, and serves approximately 550 students. The school is named after poet Paul Laurence Dunbar, a Dayton native. The school mascot is the wolverine.

About 
Paul Laurence Dunbar High School is the only historically African-American high school in Dayton. It was created to educate African-American youth and to employ teachers of color. The school originally opened on Summit Street in 1933 and graduated its first class in 1936. In 1962 a new Dunbar high school was opened and the original building was renamed MacFarlane Elementary after Paul Laurence  Dunbar's first principal, Mr. Frederic Charles MacFarlane. MacFarlane later became a middle school, it closed in 2003 and was razed in 2005.

Dunbar competes in the Dayton City League.

Notable alumni
 Mark Baker, Dayton Public Schools athletic director, former Ohio State, and NBA basketball player
 Phyllis Bolds, physicist at the United States Air Force 
 Cornelius Cash, former NBA player
 Norris Cole, basketball player for JL Bourg Basket and 2x champion
 Daequan Cook, former NBA player, in the Israeli Basketball Premier League
 Na'Shan Goddard, South Carolina and NFL             
 Johnny Green, former NBA player
 Geron Johnson, basketball player, Memphis and Developmental League
 Jerry Jones, former NFL player
 Kelvin Kirk, first Mr. Irrelevant and CFL player
 Jerry McKee, ABA basketball player
 C. J. McLin, Ohio State Representative
 Rhine McLin, Mayor of Dayton
 Bernice I. Sumlin, 19th international president of Alpha Kappa Alpha
 Dan Wilkinson, Ohio State University, first round NFL draft choice for the Cincinnati Bengals.

Ohio High School Athletic Association State Championships

 Boys Basketball – 1987, 2006, 2007, 2010, 2012
 Boys Track and Field – 1948, 1963, 1964, 1988, 1989, 1990, 2012, 2014, 2015, 2017
 Boys Track and Field Runners Up - 1962, 1965, 1970, 1984, 2001, 2011, 2018
 Boys Track & Field Indoor State Champions (OATCCC) - 2011, 2012, 2014, 2015, 2016,2017,2018
 Boys Track & Field Indoor State Runner Up (OATCCC) - 2010
 Boys Track & Field Track Program has produced 18 Track & Field All Americans
 Girls Basketball – 1991 
 Girls Track & Field State Runner Up - 2000
Girls Indoor State Runner Up- 2017

References

External links
 Dunbar High School Website
 Jessie Scott Hathcock

High schools in Dayton, Ohio
Public high schools in Ohio
1931 establishments in Ohio